Amstelveen is a municipality in the province of North Holland, Netherlands, with a population of 92.353 as of 2022. It is a suburban part of the Amsterdam metropolitan area.

The municipality of Amstelveen consists of the historical villages of Bovenkerk and Nes aan de Amstel. In addition, as well as Downtown Amstelveen (Dutch: Amstelveen stadshart), it contains the following neighbourhoods: Westwijk, Bankras-Kostverloren, Groenelaan, Waardhuizen, Middenhoven, Randwijk, Elsrijk and Keizer Karelpark. Amstelveen houses the international headquarters of Dutch national airline KLM (although it is slated to leave for Schiphol in 2024) and KPMG, one of the Big Four accounting firms. The Cobra Museum is also located in Amstelveen.

History

During the French occupation between 1810 and 1814, Amstelveen was the capital of a canton in the French department Zuyderzée, and until 1964 the municipality of Amstelveen was called Nieuwer-Amstel. It is technically a large dorp (village), because it was never walled. The symbol adopted for Amstelveen was not based on the Amsterdam symbol of three crosses, with one additional cross for distinction, but rather Amsterdam has one cross fewer, to indicate Amstelveen's and Ouder-Amstel's seniority. The Thijssepark (in full the Dr Jac. P. Thijssepark), was the first heempark in the Netherlands, and is one of sixteen heemparks or heemgroen in Amstelveen. Designed by landscape architect C. P. Broerse, following the ideas of the great Dutch naturalist and conservationist Jac. P. Thijsse, it was developed between 1940 and 1972 and covers an area of 5 hectares (about 12 acres), and is situated just south of the Amsterdamse Bos. Amstelveen was chosen as an unlikely host of a match in the 1999 Cricket World Cup, for which the Netherlands had not qualified. South Africa played Kenya in the match. Former Dutch prime minister Jan Peter Balkenende started his political career as member of the council for Amstelveen. As a result of the vicinity of Schiphol (Amsterdam Airport), and its links to Amsterdam, Amstelveen has grown and become a cosmopolitan mix of many cultures.

In the early 20th century Amstelveen was a small rural village. The turf industry had collapsed, so the village had lost its revenues from it. The village was somewhat isolated, because it had no major railway or waterway. The main source of income was livestock farming, with some arable, but horticulture and floriculture were already emerging.

In 1852 the Haarlemmermeer polder was reclaimed and the "Fort at the Schiphol" was created as a defense for Amsterdam. Forts were in those days more often named after rivers. "Fort at the Schiphol" was a ditch separating Aalsmeer and Amstelveen, and named after a piece of land from Amstelveen. Fort Schiphol became a military airport in 1916. Four years later Schiphol became a civilian airport. Schiphol Fort was demolished in 1934 to build a provincial road (Mayor Van Sonweg) from Amstelveen to Schiphol, with a swing bridge over the circular canal of the Haarlemmermeer. The development of Schiphol Airport attracted many people, many of whom settled in Amstelveen. The headquarters of KLM was established there. Amstelveen once was the fastest growing city in the Netherlands and has now grown to 91,691 inhabitants (2020).

After World War II Amstelveen caught a portion of Amsterdam's housing shortage, and was also a member of the municipality of Schiphol. Amsterdam's plan was to introduce Amstelveen as a metropolitan area, with its urban and green areas. Amstelveen remained an independent and self-conscious municipality and adopted a policy that reflected many attractive new residential areas. Amstelveen's landscaping and added art attracted much international attention.

In 1993, Amstelveen was in the news for its Krokettenmotie, debated in the municipal council after a motion proposal by Jan Peter Balkenende. In 2004 Amstelveen was voted the most attractive city in the Netherlands in which to live. Currently Amstelveen is in the top three on the national list of best cities to live in. The Amstelveen city centre also received the number one award for the Netherlands' best shopping centre in 2013, 2014 and 2015.

In 2018 the St. Urbanus Church (Sint-Urbanuskerk) in Bovenkerk caught fire. The tower remained standing but the rest of the church suffered severe damage.

The city's close proximity to Schiphol Airport makes it a prime location for people working in the aviation industry.

Economy

KLM Royal Dutch Airlines as well as the commercial organisation for the Netherlands, Belgium and Luxembourg have their head offices in Amstelveen, although it is slated to leave in 2024. Air France-KLM is represented by the KLM head office.

In addition, Amstelveen houses the international headquarters of Big Four accounting firm KPMG. Large international corporations such as Canon Inc. and Hewlett-Packard also have corporate offices in Amstelveen.

Transport

Amstelveen is served by two tram lines running south from Amsterdam Zuid station. Tram line 5 runs south via Amsterdam Zuid to Stadshart (city centre) in Amstelveen. Tram line 25 runs between Amsterdam Zuid station and Westwijk. Both tram lines serve stops between Amsterdam Zuid and Oranjebaan. Tram line 25 replaced a portion of Metro line 51 that used to run between Amsterdam Zuid station and Westwijk.

Amstelveen has a point-to-point bus connection to other villages and Amsterdam Airport Schiphol as well as a local network. There is also an extensive bus system.

Tourism and attractions

 Shopping Amstelveen city centre. This has received the number one award for best shopping center in the Netherlands in 2013, 2014 and 2015
 Aan de Poel. A fine-dining restaurant that was awarded one Michelin star for the period 2009–2012. Since 2013 it carries two Michelin stars. Aan de Poel is located on the shore of lake De Poel.
 Cobra Museum is located in the centre (Stadshart) of Amstelveen.
 Museum Jan, is centrehousing a glass art collection
 Birthplace of the artist Jan Cornelis Hofman.
 Birthplace of the actress Famke Janssen.
 Birthplace of the actor Michiel Huisman.
 Birthplace of the DJ and artist Martin Garrix
 A statue of Rembrandt overlooks the river Amstel, south east from the Amstelpark, where a windmill open to visitors is also situated
 On the Amstel river is a cheese farm called Rembrandt Hoeve. It is about 1 mile from the Rembrandt Statue, accessible by bike, boat, car or bus.
 An Electric Museum-tram line still connects Amstelveen to Amsterdam in the summer, passing by the Amsterdamse Bos and Olympic rowing lake

Secondary education 
 The Hermann Wesselink College offers vmbo-tl, havo, vwo (gymnasium and atheneum) and bilingual education
 The Keizer Karel College offers havo and vwo (atheneum, gymnasium and technasium).
 The Amstelveen College offers vmbo-tl, havo, and vwo (atheneum and gymnasium)

Other education
 The International School Amsterdam is located in Amstelveen.

Local government 
The municipal council of Amstelveen consists of 37 seats, which were in 2022 divided as follows:

Notable people

Public Thinking & Public Service 
 Jan Arnoldus Schouten (1883–1971) a Dutch mathematician and academic
 Johanna Westerdijk (1883–1961) a Dutch plant pathologist and the first female Dutch professor
 Dick Bulterman (born 1951) professor of computer science at the Vrije Universiteit
 Klaas van Berkel (born 1953 in Nieuwer-Amstel) a Dutch historian of science and academic
 Arend Jan Boekestijn (born 1959) a Dutch former politician
 Jan Peter Balkenende (born 1956) a Dutch jurist and retired politician, a city councilman in Amstelveen and Prime Minister of the Netherlands from 2002 to 2010
 Jan van Zanen (born 1961) a Dutch politician, Mayor of Amstelveen from 2005 to 2013
 Jules Maaten (born 1961 in Nieuwer-Amstel) a Dutch former politician
 Okke Ornstein (born 1965) a Dutch investigative journalist, particularly of fraud and corruption

Arts 
 Aagje Deken (1741 in Nieuwer-Amstel – 1804) a Dutch writer and novelist with Betje Wolff
 Jan Cornelis Hofman (born 1889 in Nieuwer-Amstel - 1966) a Dutch post-impressionist painter
 Hans van Manen (born 1932) a Dutch ballet dancer, choreographer and photographer
 Theo Uittenbogaard (born 1946) a Dutch radio & TV-producer
 Guido van Rijn (born 1950) a Dutch blues and gospel historian
 Leo de Boer (born 1953) a film director and lecturer at Utrecht School of the Arts
 Annemarie Roelofs (born 1955) a Dutch jazz trombone player and violinist
 Mathilde Santing (born 1958) a Dutch singer
 Antoinette Beumer (born 1962) a Dutch film director, older sister of actress Famke Janssen
 Joram Lürsen (born 1963) a Dutch film and TV director 
 Famke Janssen (born ca.1964) an actress, director, screenwriter and former fashion model
 Petra Berger (born 1965) a Dutch classical crossover singer, composer, photographer and musical actress
 Marjolein Beumer (born 1966) a Dutch actress, younger sister of actress Famke Janssen
 Damien Moyal (born 1976) a Dutch-American singer
 Luca Gianquitto (born 1978) an Italian guitarist and music composer, lives in Amstelveen
 Michiel Huisman (born 1981) a Dutch actor, musician and singer-songwriter
 Tessa Schram (born 1988) a Dutch actress and director
 Martin Garrix (born 1996) a DJ and record producer
 Mesto (born 1999 as Melle Stomp) an electronic musician, record producer, remixer and DJ

Sport 
 Han Dade (1878 n Nieuwer-Amstel – 1940) one of the three founders of AFC Ajax
 Piet Ikelaar (1896 in Nieuwer Amstel - 1992) a track cyclist and bronze medallist at the 1920 Summer Olympics 
 Ellen van Maris (born 1957) a former professional female bodybuilder
 Jolanda de Rover (born 1963) a female former backstroke swimmer, competed at the 1980, 1984 and 1988 Summer Olympics and won a gold and a bronze medal in backstroke in 1984
 John Bosman (born 1965 in Bovenkerk) a Dutch retired footballer with 522 club caps
 Nicole Muns-Jagerman (born 1967) a tennis player, competed at the 1992 Summer Olympics 
 Alexandra Verbeek (born 1973) a sailor, competed at the 1996 Summer Olympics
 Michael Reiziger (born 1973) a Dutch former professional footballer with 356 club caps
 Timme Hoyng (born 1976) a field hockey player competed at the 2008 Summer Olympics
 Lisanne de Roever (born 1979) a Dutch field hockey goalkeeper, team medallist at the 2004 and 2008 Summer Olympics
 Marlies Smulders (born 1982) a rower, team medallist at the 2004 Summer Olympics
 Robbert Schilder (born 1986) a footballer with over 350 club caps
 Kitty van Male (born 1988) a Dutch field hockey player, team gold medallist at the 2012 Summer Olympics 
 Samantha Barning (born 1989) a Dutch professional badminton player
 Kelly Jonker (born 1990) a Dutch field hockey player, team gold medallist at the 2012 Summer Olympics 
 Roland Bergkamp (born 1991) a Dutch footballer with over 200 club caps
 Mats Valk (born 1996) a Dutch Rubik's Cube speedsolver

International relations

Sister cities
Amstelveen is twinned with:

See also 
 VRA Cricket Ground
 Wagener Stadium
 Amsterdamseweg
 Rietwijkeroord

Gallery

References

External links

Official website 
Shopping Stadshart Amstelveen

 
Cities in the Netherlands
Municipalities of North Holland
Populated places in North Holland